Faecalicatena is a bacterial genus from the family of Lachnospiraceae.

References

Further reading 
 

 

Taxa described in 2017
Lachnospiraceae
Bacteria genera